Head Hunters is the twelfth studio album by American pianist and composer Herbie Hancock, released October 26, 1973, on Columbia Records. Recording sessions for the album took place in the evening at Wally Heider Studios and Different Fur Trading Co. in San Francisco, California. The album was a commercial and artistic breakthrough for Hancock, crossing over to funk and rock audiences and bringing jazz-funk fusion to mainstream attention, peaking at number 13 on the Billboard 200. Hancock is featured with his ‘Mwandishi’ saxophonist Bennie Maupin and new collaborators – bassist Paul Jackson, percussionist Bill Summers and drummer Harvey Mason. The latter group of collaborators, which would go on to be known as The Headhunters, also played on Hancock's subsequent studio album Thrust (1974). All of the musicians (with the exception of Mason) play multiple instruments on the album.

Structure and release
Head Hunters followed a series of experimental albums by Hancock's sextet: Mwandishi, Crossings, and Sextant, released between 1971 and 1973, a time when Hancock was looking for a new direction in which to take his music:

For the new album, Hancock assembled a new band, the Headhunters, of whom only Bennie Maupin had been a sextet member. Hancock handled all synthesizer parts himself (having previously shared these duties with Patrick Gleeson) and he decided against the use of guitar altogether, favoring instead the clavinet, one of the defining sounds on the album. The new band featured a tight rhythm and blues-oriented rhythm section composed of Paul Jackson (bass) and Harvey Mason (drums), and the album has a relaxed, funky groove that gave the album an appeal to a far wider audience. Perhaps the defining moment of the jazz-fusion movement (or perhaps even the spearhead of the Jazz-funk style of the fusion genre), the album made jazz listeners out of rhythm and blues fans, and vice versa. The album mixes funk rhythms, like the busy high hats in 16th notes on the opening track "Chameleon", with the jazz AABA form and extended soloing.

Of the four tracks on the album "Watermelon Man" was the only one not written for the album. A hit from Hancock's hard bop days, originally appearing on his first album Takin' Off (1962), it was reworked by Hancock and Mason and has an instantly recognizable intro featuring Bill Summers blowing into a beer bottle, an imitation of the hindewho, an instrument of the Mbuti Pygmies of Northeastern Zaire (this is also reprised in the outro). The track features heavy use of African percussion. "Sly" was dedicated to the pioneering funk musician Sly Stone, leader of Sly and the Family Stone. "Chameleon" (the opening track) is another track with an instantly recognizable intro, the introductory line played on an ARP Odyssey synth. "Vein Melter" is a slow-burner, predominantly featuring Hancock and Maupin, with Hancock mostly playing Fender Rhodes electric piano, but occasionally bringing in some heavily effected synth parts.

Heavily edited versions of "Chameleon" and "Vein Melter" were released as a 45 rpm single.

The album was also re-mixed for 4-channel quadraphonic sound in 1974. Columbia released it on LP record in the SQ matrix format and on 8-track tape.  The quad mixes feature elements not heard in the stereo version, including an additional 2-second keyboard melody at the beginning of "Sly". Surround sound versions of the album have been released a number of times on the Super Audio CD format. All of these SACD editions use a digital transfer of the original four-channel quad mix re-purposed into 5.1 surround.

Until George Benson's Breezin' (1976), it was the largest-selling jazz album of all time.

The Headhunters band (with Mike Clark replacing Harvey Mason) worked with Hancock on a number of other albums, including Thrust (1974), Man-Child (1975), and Flood (1975), the latter of which was recorded live in Japan. The subsequent albums Secrets (1976) and Sunlight (1977), had widely diverging personnel. The Headhunters, with Hancock featured as a guest soloist, produced a series of funk albums, Survival of the Fittest (1975) and Straight from the Gate (1978), the first of which was produced by Hancock and included the big hit "God Make Me Funky".

The image on the album cover, designed by Victor Moscoso, is based on the African kple kple mask of the Baoulé tribe from Ivory Coast. The image is also based on tape head demagnetizers used on reel-to-reel audio tape recording equipment at the time of this recording. Hancock is represented by the man wearing said image while playing the keyboard, and positioned clockwise around him from lower left are Mason, Jackson, Maupin and Summers.

Legacy
In 2005, the album was ranked number 498 in the book version of Rolling Stone magazine's list of the 500 Greatest Albums of All Time. While it was not included in Rolling Stone'''s original 2003 online version of the list, nor the 2012 revision, it was ranked number 254 in their 2020 reboot of the list. Head Hunters was a key release in Hancock's career and a defining moment in the genre of jazz, and has been an inspiration not only for jazz musicians, but also to funk, soul music, jazz funk and hip hop artists.  The Library of Congress added it to the National Recording Registry, which collects "culturally, historically or aesthetically important" sound recordings from the 20th century.

Track listing

Single
"Chameleon" (2:50)/"Vein Melter" (4:00) - Columbia 4-46002 (U.S.); released 1974
The single edit of "Chameleon" was released on the 2008 compilation Playlist: The Very Best of Herbie Hancock.

Personnel

Musicians
 Herbie Hancock – Fender Rhodes electric piano, Hohner D6 Clavinet, ARP Odyssey & ARP Pro Soloist synthesizers
 Bennie Maupin – tenor saxophone, soprano saxophone, saxello, bass clarinet, alto flute
 Paul Jackson – bass guitar, marímbula
 Harvey Mason – drums
 Bill Summers – agogô, balafon, beer bottles on Watermelon Man, cabasa, congas, gankogui, hindewhu, log drum, shekere, surdo, tambourine

Production
 Herbie Hancock – producer
 David Rubinson – producer
 Fred Catero – engineer
 Jeremy Zatkin – engineer
 Dane Butcher – engineer
 John Vieira – engineer

Charts

Weekly charts

Year-end charts

References

External links
 Head Hunters at Discogs
 A Crossover Artist Who Feels None the Worse for the Trip —  Billboard''
 101 Albums That Changed Popular Music: Head Hunters

1973 albums
Herbie Hancock albums
Columbia Records albums
United States National Recording Registry recordings
Albums produced by Dave Rubinson
Albums recorded at Wally Heider Studios
Jazz fusion albums by American artists
Jazz-funk albums
Funk albums by American artists
United States National Recording Registry albums